Lan Xingyu (born 18 December 1997) is a Chinese artistic gymnast. He competed in the 2019 Asian Artistic Gymnastics Championships in Ulaanbaatar, Mongolia, winning gold medals in both the team event and the still rings event. In the 2019 FIG World Cup in Doha he won an additional individual gold in still rings. At the 2021 World Artistic Gymnastics Championships he became World Champion on still rings.

References 

1997 births
Living people
Chinese male artistic gymnasts
Gymnasts from Guangxi
Sportspeople from Guangxi
World champion gymnasts
Medalists at the World Artistic Gymnastics Championships
21st-century Chinese people